Ludovic Phalippou is a French financial economist. He is a Professor of Financial Economics and the Academic Area Head of the Finance, Accounting & Economics group at University of Oxford Saïd Business School. Phalippou specializes in the institutional investor related areas of private equity, including risk management, return benchmarking, legal and governance issues, liquidity and measurement of returns. He is the author of the book, Private Equity Laid Bare, now in its third edition, and host a podcast with the same name.

Education 
Phalippou grew up on the French countryside on a small farm run by his mother. His father was a baker. He was the first in his family to go to high school and then to go to university. After high school he  studied Economics at the Toulouse School of Economics. He received his Bachelor’s degree in Economics from Toulouse School of Economics, France, in 1998. He moved to the USA on a scholarship granted by the University of Southern California as he was enrolled as a PhD student in Economics. He was granted a Master’s degree in Economics and then one in Mathematical Finance. He moved back  to France  in 2000, starting a PhD in Finance at INSEAD Business School, which he completed in 2004.

Career 
Right after his Ph.D., Phalippou moved to Netherlands and joined University of Amsterdam as an Assistant Professor,   promoted to Associate Professor in 2007. In 2011, he joined Oxford University’s Saïd Business School as an Associate Professor, obtained tenure five years later, and became a Professor of Financial Economics in 2018. In the following year, Phalippou was appointed as the Academic Area Head of the Finance, Accounting & Economics group of the Business School.

Phalippou has worked with several institutional investors on their private equity investment decisions and benchmarking systems, including Norway sovereign wealth fund, Pennsylvania Treasury, Dutch pension funds and with government bodies overseeing public pension fund systems. He was the reviewer for VINNOVA, the Swedish Governmental Agency for Innovation Systems in 2014 and 2017. From 2018 till 2019, Phalippou was the Global Head of private market research at the Blackrock Investment Institute, where he developed a model to forecast private market returns for portfolio optimization programs. He is also  a Member of the Investment Committee of Queen’s college endowment.

Awards and honors 
2019 - Q-group Jack Treynor Prize for best paper

Bibliography

Book    
Private Equity Laid Bare, 2017 (1st Edition), 2019 (2nd Edition), 2021 (3rd edition).

Book chapters 
Why is evidence on private equity performance so confusing? in Private Equity Performance Measurement, 2012
Private Equity Funds Performance, Risk and Selection in Elgar’s Research Handbook on Hedge Funds, 2010
Risk and Return of Private Equity Investments: An overview in Wiley/Blackwell's Companion to Private Equity, 2009

Selected articles  . 
Thirty years after Jensen's prediction: Is private equity a superior form of ownership?, 2020, with P. Morris, Oxford Review of Economic Policy, 36(2): 291-313.
Private Equity Portfolio Company Fees, with M. Umber and C. Rauch, 2018 Journal of Financial Economics 129(3) p559-585.
Estimating Private Equity Returns from Limited Partner Cash Flows, with A. Ang, B. Chen, and W. Goetzmann, 2018, Journal of Finance 73(4), p1751-1783.
On secondary buyouts, 2016, with F. Degeorge and J. Martin, Journal of Financial Economics 120, 124-145.
Private equity performance and liquidity risk, 2012, with F. Franzoni and E. Novak, Journal of Finance 67(6): 2341-2374.

References

External links 

French economists
Academics of Saïd Business School
1976 births
Living people
People associated with the Toulouse School of Economics